Grosvenor House was one of the largest townhouses in London, home of the Grosvenor family (better known as the Dukes of Westminster) for more than a century. Their original London residence was on Millbank, but after the family had developed their Mayfair estates, they moved to Park Lane to build a house worthy of their wealth, status and influence in the 19th century. The house gave its name to Upper Grosvenor Street and Grosvenor Square.

The house was requisitioned during the First World War, and was sold and demolished in the 1920s. The Grosvenor House Hotel was built on its site.

History

The site was originally occupied by a small house named 'Gloucester House' (after Prince William Henry, Duke of Gloucester and Edinburgh, who owned it), with the front entrance on Upper Grosvenor Street. This house was purchased by Robert Grosvenor, 1st Marquess of Westminster, in 1805 for £20,000. He spent £17,000 on extending the house to make it more fashionable. It was here that many of the Grosvenor family's treasures were held.

At each end was a triumphal arch with pediments above sculpted with the Grosvenor arms. This idea was dropped, as the 2nd Marquess thought it would be too lavish.

In 1870, Hugh Grosvenor, 3rd Marquess of Westminster (later the 1st Duke) commissioned Henry Clutton to add a porte-cochère to the north, and he had many of the state rooms redesigned. In 1889, electricity was introduced, being one of the first buildings in London to do so.

Demolition
The house was in the Grosvenor family's possession until the First World War, at which point the government requisitioned it. After the war, the family decided that the home was too lavish to maintain, and it was sold. The house was demolished during the 1920s, and the Grosvenor House Hotel was built on the site.

Art collections
It is said that the home originally housed one of the best private art collections in the world, with paintings by Gainsborough, Velázquez and other old masters. Some of these were sold between the wars, but most remain in the other Grosvenor family homes, mainly their country seat - Eaton Hall in Cheshire.

See also 
 List of demolished buildings and structures in London

Notes

Sources
Walford, Edward. Old & New London: A Narrative of Its History, Its People & Its Places, 6 vols., London, 1881, vol 4, pp. 370–372.
Young, John. A Catalogue of the Pictures at Grosvenor House, London; with etchings from the whole collection ... accompanied by historical notices of the principal works. London, 1820.

External links
 
 Detailed architectural history from the Survey of London
 Grosvenor House hotel website

Buildings and structures in Mayfair
Former houses in the City of Westminster
Palaces in London